Abaratha agama, the spotted angle, is a species of butterfly belonging to the family Hesperiidae. It is found from southern India to Myanmar and in Thailand, Laos, Vietnam, southern China, Java and Sulawesi. The species was first described by Frederic Moore in 1857.

Description

References

Tagiadini
Fauna of Pakistan
Butterflies of Asia
Butterflies of Indochina
Butterflies described in 1857